The Bracelet is a 1918 German silent crime film directed by Hubert Moest and starring Reinhold Schünzel and Eva Speyer.

Cast
 Reinhold Schünzel as Hausfreund
 Eva Speyer as Frau
 Hugo Werner-Kahle as Olt. Krannier
 Max Ruhbeck

References

Bibliography

External links

1918 films
Films of the German Empire
German silent feature films
Films directed by Hubert Moest
German black-and-white films
1918 crime films
German crime films
1910s German films
Films shot at Terra Studios
1910s German-language films